is the 6th single of W, released on September 7, 2005.

Background and release
"Miss Love Tantei" was composed by Los Angeles producers Joey Carbone and Steven Lee, the first time a songwriting team other than W's main producer, Tsunku, had written an original song for them.

The single was released on September 7, 2005 under the Zetima label. "Friendship" was included as a B-side. A video single, referred as a "Single V", was released on September 14, 2005.

Music video

The music video was directed by Hideo Kawatani and produced by Tetsushi Suehiro. The music video stars Tsuji and Kago as a multitude of characters, including Cara and Mel, their characters from their 2005 musical, Mysterious Girl Detectives Cara & Mel: The Case of the Stolen Dangerous Violin, as they solve the mystery behind a stolen jewel.

Reception

Both the CD and DVD singles debuted at #13 in the Oricon Weekly Singles and DVD Charts and charted for 4 weeks.

CD Journal praised the change in songwriting direction, calling "Miss Love Tantei" a "danceable track", as well as the rap interlude and the first press edition photo card "cute."

Track listing

Single

DVD single

Charts

Single

DVD single

References

External links
 Up-Front Works discography entries: CD, DVD

W (group) songs
Zetima Records singles
2005 singles
Song recordings produced by Tsunku
2005 songs
Songs written by Joey Carbone
Songs written by Steven Lee (music producer)